Rakai General Hospital, also known as Rakai District Hospital and Rakai Hospital, is a hospital in the Central Region of Uganda.

Location

Overview
Rakai General Hospital is a 100-bed government-owned hospital. Like most public hospitals in the country, it faces challenges of poor funding, under-staffing, poor pay and antiquated equipment.

See also
List of hospitals in Uganda

References

External links
 Website of Uganda Ministry of Health

Hospitals in Uganda
Rakai District
Central Region, Uganda